Sir Thomas Charles Drake-Brockman,  (15 May 1919 – 28 August 1992) was an Australian politician who served as a Senator for Western Australia from 1959 to 1978 and also briefly in 1958. He was a member of the National Country Party (Country Party prior to 1974). He served as Minister for Air from 1969 to 1972.

Early life and war service
Drake-Brockman was born in Toodyay, Western Australia, the son of Robert James and Rose Ita Drake-Brockman. He was educated at Guildford Grammar School. On 23 May 1942 he married Edith Sykes, with whom he had five children. During the Second World War, he joined the Royal Australian Air Force's No. 460 Squadron RAAF in 1941 as sergeant air-gunner and served in the Middle East, Malta and the United Kingdom. He was awarded a Distinguished Flying Cross in September 1944. After the war he was a farmer and grazier and became vice president of the Australian Wool and Meat Producers Federation. On 9 August 1972, Drake-Brockman married his second wife, Mary McGinnity.

Parliamentary service
Drake-Brockman was appointed to a casual vacancy as a Country Party senator on 12 August 1958. His appointment expired at the 1958 election, when he was elected to the Senate, with effect from 1 July 1959. He was appointed Minister for Air in John Gorton's second ministry, as a result of Dudley Erwin's falling out of Gorton's favour. He remained minister until the defeat of the William McMahon government at the 1972 election. He was Minister for Aboriginal Affairs and Minister for Administrative Services in Malcolm Fraser's caretaker government after the dismissal of the Whitlam government, but was not reappointed to Fraser's ministry after the 1975 election. He did not stand for re-election at the 1977 election and his term came to an end on 30 June 1978. To date, he is the last member of what is now the National Party to be elected to the Senate from Western Australia.

Drake-Brockman was made a Knight Bachelor in June 1979. He was survived by his wife, Mary, and four daughters and a son from his first marriage.

Notes

 

1919 births
1992 deaths
1975 Australian constitutional crisis
Australian World War II pilots
Members of the Australian Senate
Members of the Australian Senate for Western Australia
National Party of Australia members of the Parliament of Australia
Recipients of the Distinguished Flying Cross (United Kingdom)
Royal Australian Air Force officers
Australian Knights Bachelor
People educated at Guildford Grammar School
People from Toodyay, Western Australia
20th-century Australian politicians